Ifriqiya, also known as al-Maghrib al-Adna, was a medieval historical region comprising today's Tunisia and eastern Algeria, and Tripolitania (today's western Libya). It included all of what had previously been the Byzantine province of Africa Proconsularis and extended beyond it, but did not include the Mauretanias.

To the south, Ifriqiya was bounded by the semi-arid lands and salt marshes named el-Djerid. The northern boundary fluctuated from as far north as Sicily to the North African coastline, and the western boundary usually reached Béjaïa. The capital was briefly Carthage, then Qayrawan (Kairouan), then Mahdia, then Tunis. The Aghlabids, from their base in Kairouan, initiated the invasion of Southern Italy beginning in 827, and established the Emirate of Sicily and Emirate of Bari which lasted until it was conquered by the Normans.

History 
The province of Ifriqiya was created in 703 CE when the Umayyads seized Africa from the Byzantine Empire. Although Islam existed throughout the province, there was still considerable religious tension and conflict between the invading Arabs and the native Berbers. The beliefs and perceptions of people also shifted from area to area. This contrast was at its greatest between coastal cities and villages. Muslim ownership of Ifriqiya changed hands numerous times in its history with the collapse of the Umayyads paving the way for the Aghlabids, who acted as agents of the Abbasids in Baghdad.

They were then overthrown by the Fatimids in 909, when they lost their capital of Raqqada and the Fatimids went on to control all of Ifriqiya in 969, when they took control of Egypt. The Fatimids slowly lost control over Ifriqiya as their regents, the Zirids, became more and more autonomous until the mid-11th century when they fully separated.

Religious divisions paved the way for the Almohads to take over western Ifriqiya (Maghreb) in 1147 and all of Ifriqiya by 1160. This empire was to last until the early 13th century where it was then replaced by the Hafsids, an influential clan that boasted many of Ifriqiya's governors. The Hafsids in 1229 declared their independence from the Almohads and organized themselves under Abu Zakariya, who built the Hafsid empire around its new capital, Tunis.

Records of Arabic oral traditions imply that the Muslims first migrated to Africa feeling persecuted in their Arab homeland. However, Muslim military incursions into Africa began around seven years after the death of the Islamic Prophet Muhammad in 632. This campaign into Africa was led by the General Amr ibn al-As and Muslim control of Africa rapidly spread after the initial seizure of Alexandria.

Islam slowly took root in the East African coast due to cross-cultural links established between Muslim traders and the natives of the African coast. The political situation in Islamic Africa was like any other, filled with a chaotic and constant power struggle between movements and dynasties. A key factor in the success of any hopeful party was securing the wealth to fund a push for dominance. One source of great wealth was the lucrative gold-mining areas of Sub-Saharan Africa. The existence of these gold mines made expansion into Africa very worthwhile. The Muslim Empires pushed for influence and control of both the Northern and Southern parts of Africa. By the end of the 11th century, Islam had firmly established itself along the Mediterranean. Like the Europeans, Muslims felt the brutal effects of the Black Death in the 14th century when it arrived in Western Africa (Maghreb) through Europe. Maghreb and Ifriqiya were largely under the rule of the Ottoman Empire between the 16th and 18th centuries. Around the end of the 19th century, Islam accounted for 1/3rd of the religious population of Africa.

Islam and Africa 
A hundred years after the Islamic prophet Muhammad's death, the Arab world had expanded as far as the Indus River, thus extending their empire across Asia, Africa and Europe. Arab merchants wayfarers, and clerics began spreading Islam along the coast and into regions such as Sudan. Islam first took root with Sudanese merchants due to their increased interaction with Muslims. They were then followed by several rulers who in turn converted entire countries, such as Ghana, in the eleventh century and Mali in the thirteenth century. Due to the way in which Islam entered the African world, a large part of the rural population remained outside the Muslim realm. The spread of Islam was given new life in the eleventh century when an Islamic fundamentalist group of Berber nomads known as the Almoravids took control of the western Islamic empire. While Islam did spread throughout most of Africa it is important to note that it was a highly erratic process that occurred over a long period of time and was not constant or rapid.

Islamic influences on African Societies

In some areas such as Ghana, the presence of Muslims led to the founding of several mosques. It is believed that the Sudano Sahelian style of building was engineered by Malian king Mansa Musa, who brought back an architect from his pilgrimage to Mecca whose name was Al-Sahili. Musa's brother was instrumental in the construction of new mosques throughout the empire and established religious centres of learning to aid new and old converts in their empire. Timbuktu was one such religious centre, responsible for much of the commercial and intellectual advancement in the Mali empire. In the 16th century many of the Muslim scholars in Timbuktu hailed from Sudan. Arabic seeped into Africa and merged with Bantu to create Swahili. It is also believed that conversion was a useful way to avoid being captured and sold into slavery in the lucrative market between Lake Chad and the Mediterranean. For African leaders conversion was more of a political tool to gain support and legitimacy from the powerful Arabs whose endorsement would be useful in stamping out their enemies. However, not all tribes readily accepted Islam and the Arabs as their superiors. The Mossi who resided in modern-day Burkina Faso along with the Bamana empire in Mali expressed fierce resistance to Islam. Eventually, exposure to Islam led to the creation of an African strain of Islam with its own unique practices and rituals.

Islamic influence on African Art

The Islamic prohibition on the depiction of people and animals was accommodated and integrated into African culture. The charisma of early Muslim clerics in Africa drew swathes of people to Islam. These clerics who were known as marabouts, began producing amulets that contained verses from the Quran. These amulets gradually replaced the role of talismans in African cultures. The emphasis on avoiding representations of living beings reinforced reliance on geometric designs to create intricate patterns for textiles and other crafted goods. Masquerades were another art form that existed in Islamic Africa and  they were performed in royal courts in countries such as Mali. However, the most noticeable Islamic impression was left on the architecture of Africa, mosques especially. Islamic civilization crashed into Africa and morphed into a hallmark of cultural diversity and this is reflected nowhere better than in the multitudes of mosques all across Africa.

Notable people

Constantine the African 
Constantine the African was a scholar who was born in Carthage and migrated to Sicily in the 11th century. Constantine traveled through places such as Cairo, India and Ethiopia, and his knowledge of numerous languages helped him interpret many academic texts.

His greatest work came when he joined the Benedictine monastery at Monte Cassino, where he translated over 30 books, including works by Isaac the Jew, one of the most accomplished physicians in the Western Caliphate. He translated Muslim books on Greek medicine from Arabic to Latin, opening Europe up to a wave of medical knowledge they had had little access to before. His book The Total Art is based on The Royal Book by Persian physician Ali ibn al Abbas.

Ibn Khaldun 
Ibn Khaldun, a historian born in Tunis, was one of the most prolific academics of the Middle Ages. Ibn Khaldun's book Muqadimmah influenced waves of writers in Egypt, Turkey, and France from the 15th through 19th centuries. Ibn Khaldun served in numerous political positions in al Andalus and Al Maghreb. He fell in and out of favor with the many different powers that rose and fell in Ifriqiya. In the latter 14th century Ibn Khaldun took refuge with a tribe in Algeria and began his four-year endeavor to write an introduction to history, Muqadimmah. Volume I laid the groundwork for sociology, while the two volumes that followed explored the world of politics, subsequent books explored many different themes such as urban life, economics and the study of knowledge. He spent his later years as a judge of the Maliki fiqh in Egypt where he took his work very seriously, evaluating each case on its merits and constantly trying to eradicate flaws that he discovered in the judicial system. His somewhat strict approach to Islamic laws made some Egyptians uneasy, so he eventually left his position and traveled through the eastern reaches of the Arab world. In 1400, he parleyed outside Damascus with Timur, who was in awe of his wisdom. He managed to secure safe passage for many of the inhabitants of Damascus but could not save the city or its mosque from being sacked. After this, he went to Cairo and spent the remainder of his years in relative peace and quiet. He died in 1406 and was buried outside Cairo.

List of rulers

Conquest phase 

 Cyrenaica and Tripolitana conquered in 643 by Amr ibn al-As, organized as new province with regional capital at Barqa; first governors uncertain.
 Mu'awiya ibn Hudayj, c.665–666  — ruled from Barqa
 Uqba ibn Nafi, 666–674 — conquered south Tunisia (Byzacena), founded Kairouan (670)
 Abu al-Muhajir Dinar, 674–681
 Uqba ibn Nafi,  (restored), 681–683 — led cavalcade to Morocco, ostensibly brought the  entire Maghreb under submission.
 Uqba killed. Arabs expelled from Byzacena, which was then occupied by Awraba Berber chieftain Kusaila, 683–686.
 Zuhayr ibn Qays, 683–689 — initially only Barqa, retook Byzacena in 686.
 Zuhayr killed. Berbers under Kahina retake Byzacena in 689. No clear Arab governor, 689–92
 Hassan ibn al-Nu'man al-Ghassani, 692–703 — initially only Barqa. Captured Carthage in 695 (lost again), then again in 698 (final). Permanent conquest of Ifriqiya, organized as a new province, separately from Egypt, directly under the Umayyad Caliph, with capital at Kairouan.

Umayyad Governors of Ifriqiya

 Musa ibn Nusair al-Lakhmi, 703–715 
 (During conquest of Spain, Abd Allah ibn Musa was regent in Kairouan, while Musa was in al-Andalus, 712–715)
 Muhammad ibn Yazid, 715–718
 Ismail ibn Abd Allah ibn Abi al-Muhajir, 718–720
 Yazid ibn Abi Muslim, 720–721
 Muhammad ibn Yazid (restored), 721
 Bishr ibn Safwan al-Kalbi, 721–727
 Ubayda ibn Abd al-Rahman al-Sulami, 727–32
 Oqba ibn Qudama (temporary), 732–734
 Obeid Allah ibn al-Habhab al-Maousili, 734–41. (Berber Revolt begins 740)
 Kulthum ibn Iyad al-Qasi, 741
 Balj ibn Bishr al-Qushayri (de jure, in Córdoba) and Abd al-Rahman ibn Oqba al-Ghaffari (de facto, in Kairouan), 741–42
 Handhala ibn Safwan al-Kalbi, 742–44

Fihrid Emirs of Ifriqiya 

 (Independence from Caliphate: Berber statelets in Morocco; Fihrid coup d'état in Kairouan, 745)
 Abd al-Rahman ibn Habib al-Fihri, 745–755.
 Ilyas ibn Habib al-Fihri, 755
 Habib ibn Abd al-Rahman al-Fihri, 755–57

Kharijite rulers 

 (Fihrid Ifriqiya conquered by Kharijite Berbers in 757 — Sufrite Warfajuma in Kairouan, Ibadite Nafusa in Tripoli)
 Asim ibn Jamil al-Warfajumi (Sufrite), 757–758
 Abd al-Malik ibn Abi 'l-Jad al-Waranjumi (Sufrite), 758
 (Ibadites of Tripoli depose Sufrites in Kairouan, 758)
 Abu al-Khattab Abd al-Ala ibn al-Samh al-Maafiri (Ibadite), 758–760
 Abd al-Rahman ibn Rustem al-Farissi (Ibadite), 760–62

Abbasid governors in Kairouan 

 (Abbasid invasion of Ifriqiya; Ibadites reduced to Tahert and Nafusa, 762)
Appointed governors
 Muhammad ibn al-Ash'ath al-Khuza'i 762–765 (former Abbasid governor of Egypt)
 Isa ibn Yussuf al-Khurasani 765
 al-Aghlab ibn Salim at-Tamimi 765–766
 al-Hassan ibn Harb al-Kindi 766–767
 al-Mikhariq ibn Ghuffar 767–768

Muhallabids
 Umar ibn Hafs al-Muhallabi 768–771
 Habib ibn Habib al-Muhallabi 771
 Umar ibn Hafs al-Muhallabi 771
 Abu Hatim Yaqub ibn Labib al-Khariji 771–772 (Ibadi rebel)
 Yazid ibn Hatim al-Muhallabi 772–787
 Dawud ibn Yazid ibn Hatim al-Muhallabi 787
 Rawh ibn Hatim al-Muhallabi 787–791
 Nasr ibn Habib al-Muhallabi 791–793
 al-Fadl ibn Rawh ibn Hatim al-Muhallabi 793–795

Appointed governors
 Harthama ibn Ayan 795–797
 Muhammad ibn Muqatil al-Akki, 797–799
 Tammam ibn Tamim al-Tamimi 799–800
 Muhammad ibn Muqatil al-Akki 800

Aghlabid Emirs of Ifriqiya

Ibrahim I ibn al-Aghlab ibn Salim (800–812)
Abdallah I ibn Ibrahim (812–817)
Ziyadat Allah I ibn Ibrahim(817–838)
al-Aghlab Abu Iqal ibn Ibrahim (838–841)
Abu 'l-Abbas Muhammad I ibn al-Aghlab Abi Affan (841–856)
Ahmad ibn Muhammad (856–863)
Ziyadat Allah II ibn Abil-Abbas (863)
Abu 'l-Gharaniq Muhammad II ibn Ahmad (863–875)
Abu Ishaq Ibrahim II ibn Ahmad (875–902)
Abu 'l-Abbas Abdallah II ibn Ibrahim (902–903)
Abu Mudhar Ziyadat Allah III ibn Abdallah (903–909)

Fatimid Caliphs in Ifriqiya

Abū Muḥammad ʻAbdu l-Lāh (ʻUbaydu l-Lāh) al-Mahdī bi'llāh (909–934) — founder of the Fatimid dynasty
Abū l-Qāsim Muḥammad al-Qā'im bi-Amr Allāh (934–946)
Abū Ṭāhir Ismā'il al-Manṣūr bi-llāh (946–953)
Abū Tamīm Ma'add al-Mu'izz li-Dīn Allāh (953–975) (transferred to Egypt in 973)

Zirid dynasty rulers of Ifriqiya

Abul-Futuh Sayf ad-Dawla Buluggin ibn Ziri (973–983)
Abul-Fat'h al-Mansur ibn Buluggin (983–995)
Abu Qatada Nasir ad-Dawla Badis ibn Mansur (995–1016)
Sharaf ad-Dawla al-Muizz ibn Badis (1016–1062), — lost west Ifriqiya to Hammadid dynasty,(1018), declared independence from Fatimids (1045)
(invasion of the Banu Hilal (1057) — Kairouan destroyed, Zirids reduced to the main coastal cities, rural areas fragments into petty Bedouin emirates) 
Abu Tahir Tamim ibn al-Mu'izz (1062–1108) 
Yahya ibn Tamim (1108–1131)
Ali ibn Yahya (1115–1121)
Abul-Hasan al-Hasan ibn Ali (1121–1152)
(Ifriqiyan coast annexed by Norman Sicily (1143–1160))

Norman kings of the Kingdom of Africa (Ifriqiya) 

Roger II of Sicily (1143-1154)
William I of Sicily (1154-1160)
(All of Ifriqiya conquered and annexed by the Almohads (1160))

Hafsid governors of Ifriqiya 

Abu Muhammad Abd al-Wahid ibn Abi Hafs (1207–1216)
Abd-Allah (1224–1229)
Abu Zakariya (1229–1249)

Hafsid caliphs of Ifriqiya 

Muhammad I al-Mustansir (1249–1277)
Yahya II al-Watiq (1277–1279)
Ibrahim I (1279–1283)
Ibn Abi Umara (1283–1284)
Abu Hafs Umar I (1284–1295)
Muhammad I (1295–1309) 
Abu Bakr I (1309) 
Aba al-Baqa Khalid an-Nasir (1309–1311) 
Aba Yahya Zakariya al-Lihyani (1311–1317) 
Muhammad II (1317–1318) 
Abu Bakr II (1318–1346)
Abu Hafs Umar II (1346–1349) 
Ahmad I (1349) 
Ishaq II (1350–1369)
Abu al-Baqa Khalid (1369–1371) 
Ahmad II (1371–1394)
Abd al-Aziz II (1394–1434)
Muhammad III (1434–1436) 
Uthman (1436–1488)
Abu Zakariya Yahya (1488–1489) 
Abd al-Mu'min (Hafsid) (1489–1490) 
Abu Yahya Zakariya (1490–1494) 
Muhammad IV (1494–1526)
Muhammad V (1526–1543) 
Ahmad III (1543–1570) 
Muhammad VI (1574–1574)
Jafari "Jafari the Clean" Yahya (1574–1581)
Alem Nafirr (1581)

See also
Aghlabid
Zirid dynasty
Hafsid
Maghreb
History of Roman era Tunisia 
History of early Islamic Tunisia
History of medieval Tunisia

Notes

Sources

Chronicles

 Ibn Abd al-Hakam, English trans. by C.C. Torrey, 1901, "The Mohammedan Conquest of Egypt and North Africa", Historical and Critical Contributions to Biblical Science, pp. 277–330. online; French trans. in De la Salle Histoire des Berbères et des dynasties musulmanes de l'Afrique Septentrionale, 1852, v.1,  App. 1 (pp. 301–308)
 al-Nuwayri, French trans. in De La Salle, Histoire des Berbères et des dynasties musulmanes de l'Afrique Septentrionale, 1852, v.1,  App. 2 (pp. 314–444) (From 647 raid through end of Aghlabids) and 1854, v. 2  App.1 (pp. 483–89) (for Zirids). Italian transl. in M. Amari (1851) Nuova raccolta di scritture e documenti intorno alla dominazione degli arabi in Sicilia, (p.27-163) (Aghlabids only)
 Ibn Khaldoun, French trans. in De La Salle (1852–56), Histoire des Berbères et des dynasties musulmanes de l'Afrique Septentrionale 4 vols, Algiers: Imprimerie du Gouvernment.   v.1,  v.2   v.3,  vol. 4
 Ibn al-Athir extracts from Kamel al-Tewarikh, French trans. in De La Salle, Histoire des Berbères et des dynasties musulmanes de l'Afrique Septentrionale, 1854, v.2,  App.#5, (pp. 573ff)

Secondary
 Julien, C.A. (1931) Histoire de l'Afrique du Nord, vol. 2 – De la conquête arabe à 1830, 1961 edition, Paris: Payot.

 
Subdivisions of the medieval Islamic world
Countries in medieval Africa
Medieval Algeria
Medieval Tunisia
History of Tripolitania
Geographic history of Algeria
16th century in Algeria
14th century in Ifriqiya
16th century in Tunisia
8th-century establishments in Africa
16th-century disestablishments in Africa